Kollur Mine was a series of gravel-clay pits on the south bank of the Krishna River in the Golconda Sultanate of India. It currently falls within the state of Andhra Pradesh. It is thought to have produced many large diamonds, known as Golconda diamonds, several of which are or have been a part of crown jewels.

The mine was established in the 16th century and operated until the 19th century.

History
Kollur Mine operated between the 16th and mid-19th centuries, and was one of the largest and most productive diamond mines on the Indian subcontinent. At the height of production, around 30,000 – 60,000 people worked there, including men, women, and children of all ages. Kollur itself had a population of around 100,000.

Golconda mines were owned by the king, but operation was leased to diamond merchants, either foreigners or Indians of the goldsmith caste. As well as rent, the king also received 2% from sales and he was entitled to keep all diamonds weighing over 10 carats.

Mining at Kollur was crude, labour-intensive, and dangerous. Miners wore loincloths, slept in huts covered with straw, and were often given food instead of money. The pit walls had no timber supports and caved in after heavy rains, killing dozens of men at a time (women and children worked above ground).

Geology
The gravel-clay pits were a maximum depth of  due to the high water table. It was bounded to the east by an outcrop of the Nallamala Hills and to the north and west by a meander of the River Krishna. Most of the pits have since been filled up with scree, boulders, and eluvium from neighbouring hillsides.

Notable finds
The Tavernier Blue diamond was purchased by Jean-Baptiste Tavernier from the Kollur Mine in the mid-17th century. King Louis XIV of France bought the diamond from Tavernier, but it was stolen during the French Revolution; it reappeared and has been re-cut as the Hope Diamond. Other diamonds thought to have originated at Kollur include the Koh-i-Noor, the Great Mogul, the Wittelsbach-Graff, the Regent, the Daria-i-Noor, the Orlov, the Nizam, the Dresden Green, the Nassak.

Location and maps
Kollur Mine's location on the south bank of Krishna River is indicated at latitude 16° 42' 30" N and longitude 80° 5' E on several maps created in the 17th and 18th centuries.

All memory of its position was lost, until it was rediscovered in the 1880s by Valentine Ball, a geologist who helped to create this map of Golconda mines. In his annotated English edition of gem merchant Jean-Baptiste Tavernier's book Travels in India (1676), Ball notes that ruins of houses and mine workings could still be found at Kollur.

In the 1960s, Kollur Mine was pinpointed more accurately as being  due north-east of Kollur village on the south bank of River Krishna at latitude 16° 43' N and longitude 80° 02' E, and extending for  all the way up to Pulichinthala village.

See also
Golconda Diamonds
Placer mining

Notes

References

External links

Diamond mines in India
Geography of Guntur district
Mining in Andhra Pradesh
Former mines in India